= Improv A Go Go =

Improv A Go-Go is a weekly showcase for local improvisational theatre (or improv) groups in the Twin Cities. Produced by Five Man Job and hosted by Strike Theater, it runs most Sundays during the year.

Each week, there are 4-5 improv groups that perform for roughly 20 minutes each. Admission was $1 for the first 9 years of the show's existence but tickets are now "Pay What You Like".

Improv A Go-Go began in May 2002 at the Palace Theater in St. Paul before moving to the Brave New Workshop stage in Minneapolis until 2010 when it moved to the newly opened HUGE Improv Theater. Improv A Go-Go is an open venue to all forms of improvised theater. Slots are assigned via a lottery system, which is held three times per year on April 1, August 1 and December 1. When HUGE Theater announced their closure in October 2024, Improv a Go-Go moved to Strike Theater in Northeast Minneapolis, resuming in January 2025.

Improv A Go-Go allows established improv groups to try out new forms, and provides a venue for news groups to get stage experience. Many of these groups come out of the improv classes taught at the Brave New Workshop. Some improv participants are also a part of the Brave New Workshop's mainstage cast.

== Documentary ==
"Don't F@$! Your Partner: A Glimpse into Minneapolis Improv" follows Twin Cities improv artists in the development of Improv A Go-Go and expanding the local improv scene.
